Nairobi Diaries is a Kenyan reality television series that premiered on 14 December 2015 on K24. The one-hour show stars Noti flow a musician fashion stylist Silvia Njoki, musician and actress Ella Ciru, NGO ambassador and student Gertrude Murunga, architect Kiki Diang’a, luwi  singer and socialite and singer Pendo.

Plot 
The show follows the life of Kenyan socialites that live lavish lifestyles, an extraordinary life. It goes into their private lives, focusing on their struggles and side hustles to maintain such expensive lifestyles.

Cast 
Trap King Chrome

Marjolein Blokland
Kiki Diang’a
Mishi Dorah
Serah Molly
Andrew Lemayian
Wairimu Muigah

Series overview

References 

 Tony, "More Drama & Controversy: Socialites Risper Faith, Vanessa Chettle On Nairobi Diaries", Trending Post, 11 July 2016

2010s Kenyan television series
Kenyan reality television series
2015 Kenyan television series debuts
Kenyan television shows